Kunlon Dam is a dam project being constructed on Salween River, in northern Shan State, Burma.

The project was initiated by the Chinese firm Yunnan Machinery & Equipment Import & Export Co. (YMEC).

References

Dams in Myanmar